The Francisco de Paula Santander International Bridge is a road bridge connecting Colombia with Venezuela across the Táchira River. One of five bridges across the border between the two countries, it is about 210 meters long, with two lanes of traffic and a width of 7.3 meters.

It connects Cúcuta in North Santander, Colombia and Ureña in Táchira, Venezuela. It is named after Francisco de Paula Santander.

In 2019 the bridge was physically blocked by the Venezuelan Army.

See also 
 Simón Bolívar International Bridge
 Tienditas Bridge

References

External links

Bridges in Venezuela
Bridges in Colombia